A Woman and a Man (translit. ) is a 1971 Egyptian drama film directed by Houssam Eddine Mostafa. The film was selected as the Egyptian entry for the Best Foreign Language Film at the 44th Academy Awards, but was not accepted as a nominee.

Cast
 Nahed Sherif
 Rushdy Abaza
 Zizi Mostafa

See also
 List of submissions to the 44th Academy Awards for Best Foreign Language Film
 List of Egyptian submissions for the Academy Award for Best Foreign Language Film

References

External links
 

1971 films
1971 drama films
1970s Arabic-language films
Egyptian drama films